Tomáš Klinka (born 24 April 1977) is a Czech footballer who played as a striker. He most recently played for Kladno.

References

1977 births
Living people
Czech footballers
Czech expatriate footballers
Association football forwards
Footballers from Prague
Czech First League players
SK Slavia Prague players
FK Viktoria Žižkov players
SK Dynamo České Budějovice players
Bohemians 1905 players
FK Drnovice players
FC Fastav Zlín players
SK Kladno players
FC Spartak Trnava players
Slovak Super Liga players
2. Bundesliga players
Expatriate footballers in Slovakia
Expatriate footballers in Germany
Czech expatriate sportspeople in Slovakia
Czech expatriate sportspeople in Germany